Argia is a genus of damselflies of the family Coenagrionidae and of the subfamily Argiinae. It is a diverse genus which contains about 114 species and many more to be described. It is also the largest genus in Argiinae. They are found in the Western Hemisphere. They are commonly known as dancers. The bluer Argia species may be confused with Enallagma species.

Characteristics
This genus of damselflies are known as dancers because of the distinctive jerky form of flight they use which contrasts with the straightforward direct flight of bluets, forktails and other pond damselflies. They are usually to be seen in the open where they catch flying insects on the wing rather than flying about among vegetation picking off sedentary prey items. They tend to land and perch flat on the ground, logs and rocks. When perched, they usually hold their wing slightly raised above the abdomen.

The males of most species are some combination of black and blue but they can easily be told from similarly coloured bluets by their mode of flight. Some species have red eyes and others a copper-coloured thorax. Many species have humeral stripes, either notched or forked at the end or narrowed in the centre. The wings have short petioles and are relatively broad close to the base. Unlike most of the Coenagrionidae, dancers are often associated with flowing water.

Species
The genus includes the following species:
Additionally a fossil member of this genus is known from the Miocene Mexican amber

Notes

References

Coenagrionidae
Taxa named by Jules Pierre Rambur
Zygoptera genera